Neil "Razor" Ruddock (born 9 May 1968) is an English former professional footballer and television personality who is a club director at Enfield.

As a player he was a central defender from 1986 to 2003, and was voted the 17th "hardest footballer of all time". He made his debut at Millwall, having been associated with the club since the age of 13, and also represented Tottenham Hotspur, Southampton, Liverpool, West Ham United, Crystal Palace, Queens Park Rangers and Swindon Town during a professional career spanning 17 years. He was capped once by England, in 1994.

Ruddock came out of retirement in 2015, aged 46, to play for United Counties League side Wellingborough Whitworth. He has since appeared on a variety of television shows including I'm a Celebrity... Get Me Out of Here! and Celebrity MasterChef.

Club career

Early career
Ruddock began his career at Millwall, before signing for Tottenham Hotspur in 1986. He broke his leg on his Tottenham debut against Liverpool and made only 11 appearances for Spurs, his only goal coming in a 2–1 defeat to third tier Port Vale in the 1987–88 FA Cup. In the summer of 1988 Ruddock rejoined Millwall.

Southampton
Ruddock joined Southampton in February 1989, in a £200,000 transfer from Millwall. A rugged, uncompromising defender, he soon became popular with the Southampton fans especially after confidently scoring a penalty against Newcastle United on 1 April in only his sixth game for the club, thus helping the "Saints" earn their first victory in 18 matches and start Southampton on a climb away from the relegation zone. His goal celebration after the 89th-minute penalty became known as the "Ruddock stomp". Ruddock missed his next two penalties, allowing Matt Le Tissier to take over for the following season.

Despite early disciplinary problems at The Dell, Ruddock's talents as a confident, left-footed defender earned him England Under-21 honours. Powerful in the air, he could tackle strongly but was also able to bring the ball forward out of defence.

In the 1991–92 season, Ruddock was a member of the Southampton side that reached the final of the Zenith Data Systems Cup, where they were beaten in extra time 3–2 by Nottingham Forest.

After three years on the south coast, he was enticed back to Tottenham by Terry Venables in May 1992, with the tribunal setting the transfer fee at a "ridiculous" £750,000.

Liverpool
Ruddock was signed by Liverpool from Tottenham Hotspur on a £2.5 million transfer. While at Liverpool, Ruddock was famously involved in an on-field scuffle with Manchester United star Eric Cantona. Ruddock responded to Cantona's taunts about his weight by turning down the Frenchman's collar. In 1995, he was absolved of fracturing Peter Beardsley's jaw with an elbow in a testimonial match. Beardsley contemplated legal action on the grounds that Ruddock acted deliberately, but later decided to withdraw charges. In 1996, Ruddock's tackle on Andrew Cole of Manchester United in a reserve game at Anfield left the player with two broken legs, and Ruddock claimed innocence, while Cole said he believed Ruddock did not intend harm. However, in a 2010 interview with Talksport, he jokingly refers to the incident as "not big, and not clever", adding "but it was great", and that "I didn't mean to break both of his legs if I'm honest, I only meant to break one".

Arguably his finest game for Liverpool came on 20 January 1996, when he scored twice for them in a 5–0 home league win over Leeds United.

At Liverpool, Ruddock was also part of the squad of the 1990s under Roy Evans, known infamously as the "Spice Boys", that included the likes of David James, Robbie Fowler, Jamie Redknapp, Jason McAteer, Steve McManaman and Stan Collymore, but left in 1998 when new coach Gérard Houllier joined.

West Ham United
In July 1998, Ruddock moved to West Ham United for a fee of £300,000 making his debut on 15 August 1998 in a 1–0 away win against Sheffield Wednesday. In October 1999 whilst playing for West Ham, Ruddock was also involved in a bust-up with Arsenal's Patrick Vieira, with Vieira receiving a six-match ban and a £30,000 fine after spitting at Ruddock after some verbal sparring between the two.

In 56 games for West Ham, he scored three goals, was booked 14 times and sent-off once, in December 1998, in a 4–0 away defeat to Leeds United, for a dangerous tackle on Harry Kewell. The Hammers finished fifth in the Premier League that season – their highest finish for 13 years – and qualified for the UEFA Cup to end a 19-year absence from European competitions.

Swindon Town
In 2000, Ruddock moved to Crystal Palace on a free transfer, spending one season there before signing for Division Two side Swindon Town. He was also accused by Crystal Palace chairman, Simon Jordan in November 2005, of "taking the team out and getting them wasted when we were fighting relegation". He scored twice for Swindon, with goals against Colchester in the league and Hartlepool in the FA Cup. Relations turned sour when Ruddock refused to quit after being advised to do so by a specialist; during a period of time where the club was in serious financial difficulties. The club responded by appointing Steve Coppell as assistant manager and taking Ruddock's coaching duties away. The board eventually stopped paying Ruddock's wages in an attempt to drive him out. He took the club to an employment tribunal and in December 2002, received £57,000, representing money lost in wages and loyalty payments, with an agreement to terminate his contract as player/coach.

Wellingborough Whitworth
In January 2015, Ruddock came out of retirement at the age of 46 years, to sign for United Counties League side Wellingborough Whitworth.

Coaching career
In August 2018, Ruddock joined the coaching team of Essex Senior League side Enfield. In June 2020 he became a club director.

International career
Ruddock won four caps for the England Under-21 squad and one in 1994 for England B when he captained the team against Ireland B at Anfield. On 16 November 1994, he won his only senior cap for England, playing in a friendly against Nigeria when Terry Venables was the national team's coach.

Television career
In 2004, he appeared on the third series of I'm a Celebrity... Get Me Out of Here!. After his appearance, he recorded a charity single, a version of "Jungle Rock", with fellow contestants Lord Brocket, Peter Andre and Mike Read, performing as the Jungle Boys.

In 2006, he was involved in the television programme Razor Ruddock's Pass & Move Soccer School where children released by academies were coached by Ruddock.

In 2007, he appeared in Celebrity Wife Swap UK (Series 10 Episode 1), going to live with English singer and television personality Pete Burns, while wife Leah went to live with Burns' partner Michael Simpson.

In 2006, Ruddock helped produce Football Saved My Life a reality sports TV show for Bravo which attempted to change the lives of 15 dysfunctional men through their involvement with football.

In November 2011, he appeared in James May's Man Lab on BBC Two, coaching James May on how to score a penalty kick in front of 20,000 Germans at Veltins-Arena, Gelsenkirchen. James May missed the penalty. He appeared again in April 2013 as a member of the Manlab team representing China at the Rock, Paper, Scissors world championships.
In 2019 Ruddock appeared on BBC's Celebrity Masterchef Series 14 where he reached the final three.

In 2019 and 2020, Ruddock featured in both seasons of ITV show Harry's Heroes, which featured former football manager Harry Redknapp attempting get a squad of former England international footballers back fit and healthy for a game against Germany legends.

Personal life
Ruddock was given the nickname "Razor" by teammates after they claimed to have seen the unrelated boxer Donovan Ruddock billed as "Razor Ruddock" in a boxing match at White Hart Lane; however, Donovan Ruddock never boxed at White Hart Lane during his career.

In 2011, Ruddock declared bankruptcy. On 25 September 2014, he was featured in an episode of the Channel 5 programme Can't Pay? We'll Take It Away! where he was approached by High Court enforcement agents who were seeking to collect an alleged unpaid bill to a dog kennel of £3,000. During the encounter, Ruddock's wife used expletives while throwing water on the enforcement agents.

In 2020, Ruddock confirmed that he had been fitted with a pacemaker. He is reported to have been 'technically dead' during the operation to fit the pacemaker.

Career statistics

Club
Source:

Honours
Southampton
 Full Members Cup runners-up: 1992

Liverpool
 Football League Cup: 1994–95

West Ham United
 UEFA Intertoto Cup: 1998–99

References

External links
 Liverpool FC profile
 LFCHistory.net profile
 

England profile

1968 births
Living people
Footballers from Wandsworth
English footballers
Association football central defenders
England under-21 international footballers
England B international footballers
England international footballers
Premier League players
Crystal Palace F.C. players
Millwall F.C. players
Liverpool F.C. players
Queens Park Rangers F.C. players
Southampton F.C. players
Swindon Town F.C. players
Tottenham Hotspur F.C. players
West Ham United F.C. players
English Football League players
Wellingborough Whitworth F.C. players
Swindon Town F.C. non-playing staff
I'm a Celebrity...Get Me Out of Here! (British TV series) participants